The American Osteopathic Board of Internal Medicine (AOBIM) is an organization that provides board certification to qualified Doctors of Osteopathic Medicine (D.O.) who specialize in the prevention, diagnosis, and treatment of disease in adults (internists). The board is one of 18 medical specialty certifying boards of the American Osteopathic Association Bureau of Osteopathic Specialists approved by the American Osteopathic Association (AOA), and was established in 1942. As of December 2011, 3,072 osteopathic internal medical physicians held active certification with the AOBIM.

Board certification
Initial certification is available to osteopathic internal medicine physicians who have successfully completed an AOA-approved residency in internal medicine, two years of practice, successful completion of written and oral exams, and chart review.

Voluntary recertification was first offered in Fall 1994, and mandatory recertification began in March 1997. Before this time, the initial board certification was permanent and recertification was not required. Since March 1997, if a physician does not recertify every eight years, their board certification status expires.

Osteopathic internal medicine physicians may receive Certification of Special Qualifications in the following areas:
 Allergy/Immunology
 Cardiology
 Endocrinology
 Gastroenterology
 Hematology
 Hematology/Oncology*
 Infectious Disease
 Pulmonary Diseases
 Nephrology
 Oncology
 Rheumatology

Osteopathic internal medicine physicians may also receive Certification of Added Qualifications (CAQ) in the following areas:
 Addiction Medicine
 Critical Care Medicine
 Clinical Cardiac Electrophysiology
 Interventional Cardiology
 Geriatric Medicine
 Sports Medicine
 Undersea and Hyperbaric Medicine
 Hospice and Palliative Medicine
 Sleep Medicine

The Certification of Added Qualifications must be maintained through the process of recertification every 10 years.

In order for an osteopathic physician to be board-certified in internal medicine, they must have graduated from an osteopathic medical school, hold an active license to practice, and complete a written examination.

See also
 American Board of Internal Medicine
 American College of Osteopathic Internists
 AOA Bureau of Osteopathic Specialists

References

External links
 AOBIM homepage
 American Osteopathic Association

Internal medicine
Osteopathic medical associations in the United States
Organizations established in 1942
Medical and health professional associations in Chicago
1942 establishments in the United States